The 12721 / 12722 Dakshin Express is an Express train belonging to Indian Railways that runs between  and  in India. It is a daily service. It operates as train number 12721 from Hyderabad Deccan to Hazrat Nizamuddin and as train number 12722 in the reverse direction.

Coaches 

The 12721/2722 Dakshin Express presently has 1 AC 2 tier, 6 AC 3 tier, 9 Sleeper class, 2 General Unreserved coaches & a Pantry car coach & 2 HCP coaches. This Train has latest LHB coaches. This train consists of total 23 LHB Coaches with 1 EOG & 1 SLR.

Service 

The 12721 Dakshin Express covers the distance of 1670 kilometers in 28 hours 40 mins (58 km/hr).

As its average speed in both directions is above 58 km/hr as per Indian Railways rules, its fare has a Superfast surcharge.

Traction 

It is usually hauled by a WAP-7 (HOG)-equipped locomotive from the Lallaguda Electric Loco Shed on its entire journey.

Timetable 

 12721 Dakshin Express leaves Hyderabad Deccan every day at 23:00 hrs IST and reaches Hazrat Nizamuddin at 04:00 hrs IST on the 3rd day.
 12722 Dakshin Express leaves Hazrat Nizamuddin every day at 23:00 hrs IST and reaches Hyderabad Deccan at 05:00 hrs IST on the 3rd day.

Route & halts 

This train has total 38 Halts.

Gallery

References 

Transport in Hyderabad, India
Transport in Delhi
Named passenger trains of India
Rail transport in Telangana
Rail transport in Maharashtra
Rail transport in Madhya Pradesh
Rail transport in Andhra Pradesh
Rail transport in Uttar Pradesh
Rail transport in Haryana
Express trains in India
Railway services introduced in 1955
Rail transport in Delhi